Usak or USAK may refer to:

Places 
 Usak, Bhutan
 Ušak, Serbia
 Uşak Province, Turkey
 Uşak, its capital
 Uşak (electoral district)

Other uses 
Orkun Uşak (born 1980), Turkish footballer
International Strategic Research Organization, a Turkish think tank 

Turkish-language surnames